Bekri-ye Pain (also Romanized as Bakrī-ye Pā’īn and Bagrī-ye Pā’īn) is a village in Borun Rural District, in the Eslamiyeh District of Ferdows County, South Khorasan Province, Iran. At the 2006 census, its population was 10, in 5 families.

References 

Populated places in Ferdows County